is a Japanese rugby union player who plays as a fly-half or centre.He currently plays for Japanese club Kobelco Steelers. 

In 2011, Yamanaka received a 2 year ban from the IRB for rubbing a cream on his upper lip - in an attempt to promote moustache growth - which contained a banned steroid, either methyltestosterone or methandriol.

In his home country he plays for the Kobelco Steelers whom he joined in 2013.   He was also named in the first ever  squad which will compete in Super Rugby from the 2016 season.   Yamanaka is a Japanese international who debuted against the Arabian Gulf in 2010, but did not make the squad for either the 2011 or 2015 Rugby World Cups.

References

1988 births
Living people
Japanese rugby union players
Japan international rugby union players
Rugby union fly-halves
Rugby union centres
Kobelco Kobe Steelers players
Sportspeople from Osaka Prefecture
Sunwolves players
Rugby union fullbacks